Atherinopsinae is a subfamily of the Neotropical silversides, part of the family Atherinopsidae. This subfamily is made up of two tribes, six genera and around 30 species. They are found in the eastern Pacific and south-western Atlantic and the subfamily contains marine, brackish and freshwater species.

Tribes and genera
According to the 5th edition of Fishes of the World the Atherinopsinae is divided as set out below:
 Tribe Atherinopsini
 Genus Atherinops Steindachner, 1876
 Genus Atherinopsis Girard, 1854
 Genus Colpichthys Hubbs, 1918
 Genus Leuresthes Jordan & Gilbert, 1880
 Tribe Sorgentinini
 Genus Basilichthys Girard, 1855
 Genus Odontesthes Evermann & Kendall, 1906

References

Atherinopsidae